Emma Bissell is an English footballer who plays as a midfielder.

Club career

Manchester City W.F.C.
Having come up through Manchester City's academy system, Emma Bissell was given her first team debut when she was brought on as a substitute for Janine Beckie in a FA WSL Cup match against Aston Villa on 13 December 2018.

Bristol City W.F.C.
On 19 August 2020, Bristol City W.F.C. announced the signing of Bissell from Manchester City W.F.C. on undisclosed terms. On 6 December 2020, Bissell scored her first WSL goal in a 1–1 draw with Reading. Her strike finished off an exquisite counter attacking move which saw Bristol CIty go 1–0 up.

Career statistics

Club

Honours 
Florida State Seminoles
 NCAA Division I Women's Soccer Championship: 2021

References

External links
Profile at Soccerway

1999 births
Living people
English women's footballers
Sportspeople from Chester
Bristol City W.F.C. players
Florida State Seminoles women's soccer players
Manchester City W.F.C. players
Women's association football forwards